Janez Jurše (born 15 April 1989) is a Slovenian rower. He competed in the men's quadruple sculls event at the 2008 Summer Olympics.

References

1989 births
Living people
Slovenian male rowers
Olympic rowers of Slovenia
Rowers at the 2008 Summer Olympics
Sportspeople from Maribor
21st-century Slovenian people